This is a list of docufiction feature-length films ordered chronologically.

Please search for references inside each article:

1926: Moana by Robert Flaherty, USA
1930: Maria do Mar  by Leitão de Barros, Portugal
1931: Tabu by Robert Flaherty and F. W. Murnau, USA
1932: L'or des mers by Jean Epstein, France
1934: Man of Aran by Robert Flaherty, UK
1945: Ala-Arriba! by Leitão de Barros, Portugal
1948: La Terra Trema by Luchino Visconti, Italy
1948: Louisiana Story by Robert Flaherty, USA
1952: Children of Hiroshima by Kaneto Shindo, Japan
1956: On the Bowery by Lionel Rogosin, USA
1958: Moi, un noir (Me, A Black Man) by Jean Rouch, France
1958/59 Indie Matra Bhumi (The Motherland) by Roberto Rossellini, Italy
1959: Come Back, Africa by Lionel Rogosin, USA
1961: La pyramide humaine (The Human Pyramid) by Jean Rouch, France
1962: Rite of Spring by Manoel de Oliveira, Portugal
1963: Pour la suite du monde (Of Whales, the Moon and Men) by Pierre Perrault and Michel Brault, Canada
1964: Belarmino by Fernando Lopes, Portugal
1967: David Holzman's Diary by Jim McBride, USA
1971: Petit à petit (Little by Little) by Jean Rouch, France
1973: Trevico-Torino (viaggio nel Fiat-Nam) by Ettore Scola, Italy
1974: Orders (Les Ordres), by Michel Brault, Canada
1974: Cocorico! Monsieur Poulet by Jean Rouch, France
1976: People from Praia da Vieira by António Campos, Portugal
1976: To Fly! by Greg MacGillivray and Jim Freeman (USA)
1976: Trás-os-Montes by Antonio Reis and Margarida Cordeiro, Portugal
1981: Transes (fr) by Ahmed El Maânouni, Morocco
1982: Ana by António Reis and Margarida Cordeiro, Portugal
1982: After the Axe by Sturla Gunnarsson, Canada
1984: The Masculine Mystique by Giles Walker and John N. Smith (Canada)
1985: 90 Days by Giles Walker (Canada)
1986: Sitting in Limbo by John N. Smith (Canada)
1987: The Last Straw by Giles Walker (Canada)
1987: Train of Dreams by John N. Smith (Canada)
1988: Mortu Nega (Death denied) by Flora Gomes, Guiné-Bissau
1989: Welcome to Canada by John N. Smith (Canada)
1990: The Company of Strangers, by Cynthia Scott, Canada
1990: Close-Up by Abbas Kiarostami, Iran
1991: Zombie and the Ghost Train by Mika Kaurismäki, Finland
1991: And Life Goes On by Abbas Kiarostami, Iran
1998: Whoever Dies, Dies in Pain (Quiconque meurt, meurt à douleur) by Robert Morin, Canada
2000: In Vanda's Room by Pedro Costa, Portugal  
2001: Waking Life by Richard Linklater, United States
2002: City of God by Fernando Meirelles and Kátia Lund, Brasil
2002: Ten by Abbas Kiarostami, Iran
2005: Underexposure by Oday Rasheed, Iraq
2006: Colossal Youth by Pedro Costa, Portugal
2006: Angadi Theru by Vasantha Balan, India
2008: Our Beloved Month of August by Miguel Gomes, Portugal
2009: The Mouth of the Wolf by Pietro Marcello, Italy
2013: Closed Curtain by Jafar Panahi and Kambuzia Partovi, Iran
2013: Interior. Leather Bar. by James Franco and Travis Mathews (USA)
2015: Taxi by Jafar Panahi, France
2016: Your Name Here by B. P. Paquette, Canada
2016: Lightman by Kumar G. Venkatesh, India

 
Docufiction films
Films by type